Grannis Island is an uninhabited island in the Quinnipiac River in New Haven, Connecticut. It is owned by the New Haven Land Trust as part of the Eugene B. Fargeorge Nature Preserve at Quinnipiac Meadows

The island was inhabited by Quinnipiac Native Americans in historic times. Archeological digs have identified dog burials, middens, fire pits and other signs of human habitation.

External links
Grannis Island History Podcast by Cold Spring School
Preliminary Report On the Excavations at Grannis Island (1952)
Findings for Grannis Island compiled from the research of Jeanne van Orman
Public Paddles to Its Archeological Treasure, New Haven Independent

Landforms of New Haven County, Connecticut
Native American history of Connecticut
River islands of Connecticut
Geography of New Haven, Connecticut
Uninhabited islands of the United States
Protected areas of New Haven County, Connecticut